Hentown is an unincorporated community in Early County, in the U.S. state of Georgia.

History
The community was named for the fact a local resident kept a large flock of chickens.

References

Unincorporated communities in Early County, Georgia
Unincorporated communities in Georgia (U.S. state)